Legan chess (or Legan's game) is a chess variant invented by L. Legan in 1913. It differs from standard chess by the starting position as well as by pawn movements.

Rules
The starting setup is illustrated. The game can be also played with the board rotated by 45° clockwise to make pawn movements easier to understand.  There is no castling and no en passant. Otherwise, the rules of chess apply.

Pawn movement

Pawns move one square diagonally forward: White from right to left; Black left to right. They capture orthogonally in direction of movements (see diagram). The white pawn on f3 can move to e4 and capture on e3 and f4. The black pawn on b6 can move to c5 and capture on b5 and c6.

Pawn promotion

Pawns promote on squares occupied in the initial position by the opponent's king, bishops, knights, and rooks. For example, white pawns promote on squares a5–a8–d8 (marked with white dots); black pawns on e1–h1–h4 (marked with black dots).  Note that the pawns that start on d1, h5, a4 and e8 cannot promote without moving toward the center of the board via capturing.

References

Bibliography

Chess variants
1913 in chess
Board games introduced in 1913